Ram Gopal may refer to:
 Ram Gopal (author) (born 1925), Indian writer and historian
 Ram Gopal Varma (born 1962), Indian screenwriter, film director/producer
 Ram Gopal (dancer) (1912–2003), Bangalore-born British dancer
 Ram Gopal Bajaj (born 1940), National School of Drama director
 Ram Gopal Yadav (born 1946), Indian politician

See also
 Ram Gopal Varma Ke Sholay, 2007 Indian film